Polyrhaphis michaeli is a species of beetle in the family Cerambycidae. It was described by McCarty in 1997. It is known from Mexico.

References

Polyrhaphidini
Beetles described in 1997